Gayo is an Austronesian language spoken by some 100,000 people (2000) in the mountainous region of Aceh around Central Aceh, Bener Meriah and Gayo Lues regencies. It is classified as belonging to the Western Malayo-Polynesian branch of the Austronesian languages, but is not closely related to other languages. Ethnologue lists Deret, Lues, Lut, and Serbejadi-Lukup as dialects.

Gayo is distinct from other languages in Aceh. The art and culture of the Gayo people is also significantly different compared with other ethnic groups in Aceh.

In 1907, G.A.J. Hazeu wrote a first Gayo–Dutch dictionary for the colonial authorities of the Dutch East Indies.

References

Further reading

External links 
 An open access of recordings in Gayo are available through Paradisec, including traditional stories, historical narratives and conversation.

Northwest Sumatra–Barrier Islands languages
Languages of Indonesia
Gayonese people
Languages of Aceh